Healing is an album by Latin freestyle artist Stevie B. It was released in 1992 by Epic Records. B promoted the album by playing shows with Technotronic.

Track listing

Charts
Singles - Billboard (North America)

References

1992 albums
Stevie B albums